is Mao Abe's second album, released on . The album was released in two versions: a regular version and a limited edition CD+DVD version.

Recording
The album consists of songs Abe wrote in her second and third years of high school. "15 no Kotoba" was written just after Abe's first album was released in early 2009, and "Itsu no Hi mo" in September. Abe has not written any songs since then, blaming personal stress though finding live performance easy in this time, due to its passive nature and the lack of a need to quietly concentrate.

Abe started creating the album in June 2008. Unlike her first album, she made it without a specific theme or concept in mind. Abe found they clashed with the image she created of herself for the first album, instead wanting to focus on songs that would solidify her sound.

Promotion
The album was preceded by three singles. "Tsutaetai Koto/I Wanna See You", Abe's first physically released single, featured tie-ups for both A-sides: "Tsutaetai Koto" was the music variety show Hey! Hey! Hey! Music Champ'''s ending theme song, while "I Wanna See You" was used in Calpis Water commercials. "I Wanna See You", along with her next single "Anata no Koibito ni Naritai no Desu", were originally released in 2008 on iTunes as acoustic demos. The third single, "Itsu no Hi mo", was used as the ending theme song for the Fuji TV documentary variety talk show .

"Mada" was used as a radio single to coincide with the album's release. It reached #23 on the Billboard Japan Hot 100.

An album track, "15 no Kotoba", was used as the theme song to the film Hanbun no Tsuki ga Noboru Sora'', starring Sosuke Ikematsu.

Track listing

CD track list
All songs written by Mao Abe.

DVD track list

Singles

Japan sales rankings

References
 	

Mao Abe albums
2010 albums
Pony Canyon albums